Ae-jung is a Korean feminine given name. It is homophonous with the Sino-Korean word for "love". However it may also be written other ways, with different hanja for each syllable of the name. There are 14 hanja with the reading "ae" and 75 hanja with the reading "jung" on the South Korean government's official list of hanja which may be registered for use in given names.

People with this name include:
Lee Ae-jung (1987–2007), South Korean actress
Lee Ae-jung (cyclist), South Korean road cyclist, silver medallist in Cycling at the 2011 Summer Universiade

Fictional characters with this name include:
Gu Ae-jung, in 2011 South Korean television series The Greatest Love
Cha Ae-jung, in 2013 South Korean television series Reply 1994

See also
List of Korean given names

References

Korean feminine given names